Sirotovo is a rural locality (a village) in Lukinskoye Rural Settlement, Chagodoshchensky District, Vologda Oblast, Russia. The population was 20 as of 2002.

Geography 
Olisovo is the nearest rural locality.

References 

Rural localities in Chagodoshchensky District